Gary Lee Roberts (born November 30, 1946) is a former American football offensive guard. 

Roberts was born in Parkersburg, West Virginia, in 1946 and attended Theodore Roosevelt High School in Kent, Ohio. He played college football at Purdue and was selected by the New York Jets in the 11th round (268th overall pick) of the 1969 NFL Draft. He appeared in 11 games for the Atlanta Falcons, six of them as a starter, during the 1970 season.

References

1946 births
Living people
American football offensive guards
Purdue Boilermakers football players
Atlanta Falcons players
Players of American football from West Virginia
Sportspeople from Parkersburg, West Virginia